The Andean caenolestid (Caenolestes condorensis), also known as the Andean shrew opossum or Condor caenolestid, is a shrew opossum known only from Cordillera del Cóndor (Ecuador), its type locality. It was first described by zoologists Bruce D. Patterson and Albuja V. Luis in 1996. It is the largest caenolestid. The IUCN classifies it as vulnerable. As of 2015, the population is estimated at less than 1,000.

Taxonomy and etymology 
The Andean caenolestid is one of the five members of Caenolestes, and is placed in the family Caenolestidae (shrew opossums). It was first described by zoologists Bruce D. Patterson (of the Field Museum of Natural History) and Albuja V. Luis (of the National Polytechnic School) in 1996 from an adult male specimen captured from Cordillera del Cóndor (Ecuador). They procured a total of three specimens.

In the latter part of 20th century, scientists believed that Caenolestes is closely related to Lestoros (the Incan caenolestid). Over the years, it became clear that Lestoros is morphologically different from Caenolestes. A 2013 morphological and mitochondrial DNA-based phylogenetic study showed that the Incan caenolestid and the long-nosed caenolestid (Rhyncholestes raphanurus) form a clade sister to Caenolestes. The cladogram below is based on this study.

Caenolestid fossils date to as early as the early Eocene (nearly 55 mya). The generic name Caenolestes derives from the Greek words kainos ("new") and lestes ("robber", "pirate"). The specific epithet condorensis is based on the name of the type locality, Cordillera del Cóndor. It is also known by the name 'Condor caenolestid'.

Description 
Patterson and Luis identified the Andean caenolestid as the largest in its family. Sexual dimorphism is prominent, with males larger than females.

Distribution and status 
The Andean caenolestid is known only from Cordillera del Cóndor, which is located in the eastern Andes. The specimens were captured on the ecotone (interface) between the short grassy vegetation of the plateau and the higher, wooded slopes. The IUCN classifies it as vulnerable. As of 2015, the population is estimated at less than 1,000.

References

External links

Shrew opossums
Endemic fauna of Ecuador
Marsupials of South America
Mammals of Ecuador
Vulnerable animals
Vulnerable biota of South America
Mammals described in 1996